Niverka Dharlenis Marte Frica (born October 19, 1990 in Santo Domingo) is a volleyball player from the Dominican Republic. She played the 2012 Summer Olympics with the Dominican Republic national team ranking in fifth place. She also played the 2010 and the 2014 World Championship earning the 17th place and the fifth place and the 2011 and the 2015 FIVB World Cup with  her national team ranking in the eight and seventh place. She won the bronze medal in the 2015 Pan American Games.

With her Junior national team, she took the silver at the 2009 World Championship.

Career
During the 2006 season, she played in La Romana with Aviación and with Mirador at Distrito Nacional Superior Championship, winning her team the league championship.

Niverka played for her native country at the 2007 FIVB Girls' U18 Volleyball World Championship in Baja California, Mexico. There her team ended up in 8th place.

In 2008, she participated at the NORCECA Women´s Junior Continental Championship U-20 as team captain, winning with her them the silver medal and individually, the "Best Setter" award. Shortly afterwards she claimed the gold medal at the 2008 Women's Pan-American Volleyball Cup in Mexico, with the senior national team.

With the National Junior Team she won the silver medal with the at the 2009 Women's U20 Volleyball World Championship.

Playing beach volleyball (three) with Ana Yorkira Binet and Marianne Fersola, she won the gold medal at the 2010 Hato Mayor Beach Volleyball Tournament.

As a setter, she helped the National Senior Team playing in Chiapas, Mexico, to win the 2010 Final Four Cup gold medal.

Marte returned to Hato Mayor to win the gold medal in the annual Sport Festival in Beach Volleyball (three), this time playing along Altagracia Mambrú and Ana Yorkira Binet.

In 2012, Marte played on Olympic Games, where Dominican Republic qualified to quarter-final.

In September 2012, Marte won the gold medal at the first 2012 U23 Pan-American Cup, played in Callao, Peru.

Marte was transferred to the Azerbaijani Club Igtisadchi Baku in early November. With this club, she claimed the silver medal of the 2012/13 Azerbaijani Super League.

During the 2014 World Championship held in Italy, Marte helped the national team to reach the competition's fifth place starting with 7-2 record, and despite the losing 2-3 to China, her team qualified for the first time to the World Championship third round besides but being unable to reach a semifinal spot after losing their two third round matches 2-3 to China and 0-3 to Brazil.

Marte and her national team took part of the 2014 Central American and Caribbean Games. and she helped them to win their fourth consecutive gold medal, being awarded Best Setter of the tournament.

Marte was part of the Dominican Republic delegation to the 2015 Pan American Games, and she won with her national team the bronze medal after losing to the United States in the semifinals and defeated 3-1 the Puerto Rico national team. After leading the setters during the 2015 FIVB World Cup she was awarded tournament's Best Setter while her national team posted a 5-6 record, valid for the seventh place. After the World Cup, she was announced to be transferred to the French club Rocheville Le Cannet taking the role of the main setter for the 2015-16 season. Castillo won the silver medal and the Best Setter award in the NORCECA Championship. In December 2015, Marte won with her club the French Supercup, defeating RC Cannes 3-2 in the championship match.

Clubs
 Deportivo Nacional (2004)
 Modeca (2005)
 Mirador (2006)
 Aviación (2006)
 Deportivo Nacional (2007–2008)
 Distrito Nacional (2007–2010)
 Mirador (2010)
 Igtisadchi Baku (2012-2013)
 Mirador (2015)
 Rocheville Le Cannet (2015-2016)
 Geminis de Comas (2018-2019)
 Jakarta Pertamina Energi (2022)

Awards

Individuals
 2008 NORCECA Junior Continental Championship U-20 "Best Setter"
 2014 Central American and Caribbean Games "Best Setter"
 2015 FIVB World Cup "Best Setter"
 2015 NORCECA Championship "Best Setter"
 2022 Pan-American Cup "Most Valuable Player"

National Team

Senior Team
 2008 Pan-American Cup -  Gold Medal
 2008 Final Four Women's Cup -  Silver Medal
 2009 FIVB World Grand Champions Cup -  Bronze Medal
 2009 NORCECA Championship -  Gold Medal
 2009 Pan-American Cup -  Silver Medal
 2009 Final Four Women's Cup -  Bronze Medal
 2010 Final Four Women's Cup -  Gold Medal
 2010 Central American and Caribbean Games -  Gold Medal
 2010 Pan-American Cup -  Gold Medal
 2011 Pan-American Cup -  Silver Medal
 2011 NORCECA Championship -  Silver Medal
 2012 U23 Pan-American Cup -  Gold Medal
 2013 Pan-American Cup -  Silver Medal
 2013 NORCECA Championship -  Silver Medal
 2014 Pan-American Cup -  Gold Medal
 2014 Central American and Caribbean Games -  Gold Medal
 2015 Pan-American Cup -  Silver Medal
 2015 Pan American Games -  Bronze Medal

Junior Team
 2006 NORCECA Girls Youth Continental Championship U-18  Silver Medal
 2008 NORCECA Women´s Junior Continental Championship U-20  Silver Medal
 2009 FIVB U20 Volleyball World Championship  Silver Medal

Clubs
 2006 Dominican Republic Distrito Nacional Superior Tournament 2006 -  Champion, with Mirador
 2007 & 2008 Dominican Republic Volleyball League -  Champion, with Distrito Nacional
 2012-13 Azerbaijan Super League -  Runner-Up, with Igtisadchi Baku
 2015 French Supercup -  Champion, with Rocheville Le Cannet
 2022 Indonesian Proliga - 4th place, with Jakarta Pertamina Energi

Beach Volleyball
 2010 Hato Mayor Beach Volleyball Tournament  Gold Medal
 2011 Hato Mayor Beach Volleyball Tournament  Gold Medal

References

External links
 FIVB Profile

1990 births
Living people
Sportspeople from Santo Domingo
Dominican Republic women's volleyball players
Volleyball players at the 2012 Summer Olympics
Volleyball players at the 2015 Pan American Games
Pan American Games bronze medalists for the Dominican Republic
Olympic volleyball players of the Dominican Republic
Pan American Games medalists in volleyball
Central American and Caribbean Games gold medalists for the Dominican Republic
Competitors at the 2010 Central American and Caribbean Games
Competitors at the 2014 Central American and Caribbean Games
Igtisadchi Baku volleyball players
Setters (volleyball)
Expatriate volleyball players in Azerbaijan
Expatriate volleyball players in France
Dominican Republic expatriates in France
Central American and Caribbean Games medalists in volleyball
Medalists at the 2015 Pan American Games
Volleyball players at the 2020 Summer Olympics